Rev. Frank Yarborough House is a historic home located at Batesburg-Leesville, Lexington County, South Carolina. It was built about 1906, and is a one-story frame Victorian cottage set on open brick piers. It features an ornamented wraparound porch and a steep central cross gable.

It was listed on the National Register of Historic Places in 1982.

References

Houses on the National Register of Historic Places in South Carolina
Victorian architecture in South Carolina
Houses completed in 1906
Houses in Lexington County, South Carolina
National Register of Historic Places in Lexington County, South Carolina
1906 establishments in South Carolina